John George Scott (14 August 1904 – 1976) was an English professional footballer of the 1930s. Born in Blackhill, he joined Gillingham from Newcastle United in 1930 and went on to make 39 appearances for the club in The Football League, scoring seven goals. He left to join North Shields in 1932. He joined Wigan Athletic in 1933, where he scored 79 goals in 120 Cheshire League appearances for the club.

References

1904 births
1976 deaths
English footballers
Sportspeople from Consett
Footballers from County Durham
South Shields F.C. (1889) players
Newcastle United F.C. players
Gillingham F.C. players
Association football outside forwards
North Shields F.C. players
Wigan Athletic F.C. players